A roundhouse is a type of house with a circular plan, usually with a conical roof. In the later part of the 20th century, modern designs of roundhouse eco-buildings were constructed with materials such as cob, cordwood or straw bale walls and reciprocal frame green roofs.

Europe

United Kingdom

Roundhouses were the standard form of housing built in Britain from the Bronze Age throughout the Iron Age, and in some areas well into the Sub Roman period. The people built walls made of either stone or of wooden posts joined by wattle-and-daub panels, and topped with a conical thatched roof. These ranged in size from less than 5m in diameter to over 15m. The Atlantic roundhouse, Broch, and Wheelhouse styles were used in Scotland. The remains of many Bronze Age roundhouses can still be found scattered across open heathland, such as Dartmoor, as stone 'hut circles'.

Early archeologists determined what they believed were the characteristics of such structures by the layout of the postholes, although a few timbers were found preserved in bogs.  The rest has been postulated by experimental archaeology, which has tried different techniques to demonstrate the most likely form and function of the buildings.  For example, experiments have shown that a conical roof with a pitch of about 45 degrees would have been the strongest and most efficient design.  

[[Peter J. Reynolds

fire would have been lit inside for heating and cooking, there could not have been a smoke hole in the apex of the roof, for this would have caused an updraft that would have rapidly set fire to the thatch. Instead, smoke would have been allowed to accumulate harmlessly inside the roof space, and slowly leak out through the thatch. 

Many modern simulations of roundhouses have been built, including:

Must Farm revelations 
Much of the earlier supposition was confirmed or denied at a stroke by the finding of a set of Bronze Age roundhouses at the archaeological dig at Must Farm in Cambridgeshire, UK, where samples of all the materials, from posts to walls, to roof were all found, collapsed and charred, but still in situ after 3 000 years.

Modern British roundhouses

That Roundhouse is an early example of a modern roundhouse dwelling which was built in Pembrokeshire Coast National Park, Wales without planning permission as part of the Brithdir Mawr village which was discovered by the authorities in 1998. It is constructed from a wooden frame of hand-cut Douglas Fir forest thinnings with cordwood infill, and reciprocal frame turf roof based on permaculture principles mainly from local natural resources. It was subject to a lengthy planning battle including a court injunction to force its demolition before finally receiving planning approval for 3 years in September 2008.

Ireland
Irish crannógs are located in Craggaunowen, Ireland; the Irish National Heritage Park, in Wexford, Ireland

Italy

Trulli (singular: trullo) are houses with conical roofs, and sometimes circular walls, found in parts of the southern Italian region of Apulia.

Spain

Galicia – Asturias

Pallozas

A palloza is a traditional thatched house as found in Leonese county of El Bierzo, Serra dos Ancares in Galicia, and south-west of Asturias; corresponding to Astur tribes area, one of pre Hispano-Celtic inhabitants of northwest Hispania. It is circular or oval, and about ten or twenty metres in diameter and is built to withstand severe winter weather at a typical altitude of 1,200 metres.

The main structure is stone, and is divided internally into separate areas for the family and their animals, with separate entrances. The roof is conical, made from rye straw on a wooden frame. There is no chimney, the smoke from the kitchen fire seeps out through the thatch.

As well as living space for humans and animals, a palloza has its own bread oven, workshops for wood, metal and leather work, and a loom. Only the eldest couple of an extended family had their own bedroom, which they shared with the youngest children. The rest of the family slept in the hay loft, in the roof space.

Castros

Russia 
The Taganrog Round House is a residential apartment building in Taganrog, Rostov and was the first round house built in the USSR. The building is a modern round house built in 1929 and inhabited on 7 November 1932. The shared toilet was outside the house, about 20 meters from it. Plumbing and sewerage were equipped in the apartments of the house only in the early 1960s. By the 80th anniversary of the round house in October 2012, major repairs were carried out, and the anniversary itself was marked by a celebration held in the courtyard by the tenants of the house.

North America
Roundhouses were a common form of architecture in some Native American Tribes.  Traditional roundhouses were often used for ceremonies "and provided a large work area during inclement weather."  The Chaw Se' Roundhouse in California's Indian Grinding Rock State Historic Park is designated with state historical marker #1001.

Modern roundhouses are being built such as the one at Dancing Rabbit Ecovillage near Rutledge, Missouri, built of cob.

Oceania

Raun Haus, Papua New Guinea
Roundhouses are still in use in Papua New Guinea and are very similar to the ones built in western Europe.

References

External links

 Characterising the Welsh Roundhouse: chronology, inhabitation and landscape
 A 21st-century iron age round house
 Some examples of Reconstructed Celtic Roundhouses

House types

Archaeology of structures
European archaeology
Sustainable building